Anastasia, the False Czar's Daughter is a 1928 German silent drama film directed by Arthur Bergen and starring Lee Parry, Hans Stüwe and Elizza La Porta. It was shot at the National Studios in Berlin. The film's art direction was by Otto Moldenhauer.

Cast

References

Bibliography

External links

1928 films
Films of the Weimar Republic
1928 drama films
German silent feature films
German drama films
Films directed by Arthur Bergen
Films set in Russia
Films set in the 1910s
Films about amnesia
National Film films
Cultural depictions of Grand Duchess Anastasia Nikolaevna of Russia
German black-and-white films
Silent drama films
1920s German films
1920s German-language films